Old-Age Insurance (Agriculture) Convention, 1933 (shelved) is  an International Labour Organization Convention.

It was established in 1933:
Having decided upon the adoption of certain proposals with regard to compulsory old-age insurance,...

Modification 
This concept contained in the convention were revised and included in ILO Convention C128, Invalidity, Old-Age and Survivors' Benefits Convention, 1967.

Ratifications
Prior to its shelving, the convention had been ratified by 10 states.

External links 
Text.
Ratifications.

Shelved International Labour Organization conventions
Social security
Treaties concluded in 1933
Treaties entered into force in 1937
Agricultural treaties